What Is America? A Short History of the New World Order is a 2008 non-fiction book by  Ronald Wright that continues the thread begun in A Short History of Progress by examining what he calls "the Columbian Age" and consequently the nature and historical origins of modern American imperium.

See also
A Short History of Progress
Stolen Continents

References

External links
 Publisher's site Knopf Canada
 Q&A: Birth of a Nation CBC-hosted author interview

2008 non-fiction books
21st-century history books
Canadian non-fiction books
Books about Native American history
Books about foreign relations of the United States
Anti-Americanism
Da Capo Press books
Knopf Canada books